() is a made up word coined in 1935 by the then president of the National Puzzlers' League, Everett M. Smith. It has sometimes been used as a synonym for the occupational disease known as silicosis, but it should not be as most silicosis is not related to mining of volcanic dusts, and no evidence of silicosis has been found in populations exposed to crystalline silica in volcanic ash. It is the longest word in the English language published in a dictionary, Oxford Dictionaries, which defines it as "an artificial long word said to mean a lung disease caused by inhaling very fine ash and sand dust".

Clinical and toxicological research conducted on volcanic crystalline silica has found little to no evidence of its ability to cause silicosis/-like diseases and geochemical analyses have shown that there are inherent factors in the crystalline structure which may render volcanic crystalline silica much less pathogenic than some other forms of crystalline silica.

Silicosis is a form of occupational lung disease caused by inhalation of crystalline silica dust, and is marked by inflammation and scarring in the form of nodular lesions in the upper lobes of the lungs. It is a type of pneumoconiosis and is known in the United Kingdom as black lung.

Etymology
 is the longest word in the English language. 
The word can be analysed like this:

 Pneumono: from ancient Greek which means lungs
 ultra: from Latin, meaning beyond
 micro and scopic: from ancient Greek, meaning small looking, referring to the fineness of particulates
 silico-: from Latin, silicon
 volcano: from Latin, referring to volcano
 coni: from ancient Greek which means dust
 -osis: from ancient Greek, suffix to indicate a medical condition

This word was invented in the daily meeting from the National Puzzlers' League (N.P.L.) by its president Everett M. Smith. The word featured in the headline for an article published by the New York Herald Tribune on February 23, 1935, titled "Puzzlers Open 103rd Session Here by Recognizing 45-Letter Word":

 Although it has been defined as a synonym of pneumoconiosis, there is no scientific evidence for a similar disease related to volcanic particle exposures.

Subsequently, the word was used in Frank Scully's puzzle book Bedside Manna, after which time, members of the N.P.L. campaigned to include the word in major dictionaries.

This 45-letter word, referred to as "P45", first appeared in the 1939 supplement to the Merriam-Webster New International Dictionary, Second Edition.

Particles of a size able to enter the lung (< 10 μm diameter) gently settle on the lung lining rather than cutting or abrading the surface.

See also 

 
 
 Coalworker's pneumoconiosis
 Floccinaucinihilipilification
 Health hazards of vog
 Honorificabilitudinitatibus
 List of long place names
 Longest word in English
 Longest words

References

External links 

English words
Long words